Aoupinieta novaecaledoniae is a species of moth of the family Tortricidae. It was described by Razowski in 2012 and is endemic to New Caledonia.

The ground colour of the forewings is yellow with dark orange reticulation and dark brown markings. The hindwings are creamish.

Etymology
The species name refers to the country of origin.

References

External links

Moths described in 2012
Endemic fauna of New Caledonia
Archipini
Taxa named by Józef Razowski